George Raymond Wagner (March 23, 1915 – December 26, 1963) was an American professional wrestler known by his ring name Gorgeous George. In the United States, during the First Golden Age of Professional Wrestling in the 1940s–1950s, Gorgeous George was one of the biggest stars of the sport, gaining media attention for his outrageous character, which was described as flamboyant and charismatic. He was a major national celebrity at his peak, and was largely or even solely responsible for establishing television as a viable entertainment medium, in its early days. He was posthumously inducted into the Professional Wrestling Hall of Fame in 2002 and the WWE Hall of Fame as part of the Class of 2010.

Early life
Wagner, of German heritage, was born March 24, 1915, in Butte, Nebraska. For a time, his family lived on a farm near the village of Phoenix in Holt County and probably in Seward County before they moved to Waterloo, Iowa and later Sioux City. When he was 7 years old, Wagner's family moved to Houston, Texas, where he associated with kids from a tough neighborhood. As a child, he trained at the local YMCA and often staged matches against his friends. In 1929, he dropped out of Milby High School at 14, and worked odd jobs to help support his family. At this time, he competed at carnivals, where he could earn 35 cents for a win. By age 17, he was getting booked by the region's top promoter, Morris Siegel, and in 1938, he won his first title by defeating Buck Lipscomb for Northwest Middleweight crown. Moreover, on May 19, 1939, he captured the Pacific Coast Light Heavyweight Championship.

Career
At 5 ft 9 in and 215 pounds (1.75 m and 98 kg), Wagner was not especially physically imposing by professional wrestling standards, nor was he an exceptional athlete, although he was a gifted amateur wrestler. Nevertheless, he soon developed a reputation as a solid in-ring wrestler. In the late 1930s, he met Elizabeth "Betty" Hanson, whom he would later marry in an in-ring ceremony. When the wedding proved a good drawing card, the couple re-enacted it in arenas across the country enlightening Wagner to the potential entertainment value that was left untapped within the industry. Around this same time, Vanity Fair magazine published a feature article about a professional wrestler named 'Lord' Patrick Lansdowne, who entered the ring accompanied by two valets while wearing a velvet robe and doublet. Wagner was impressed with the bravado of such a character, but he believed that he could take it to a much greater extreme.

Subsequently, Wagner debuted his new "glamour boy" image on a 1941 card in Eugene, Oregon, and he quickly antagonized the fans with his exaggerated effeminate behavior when the ring announcer introduced him as "Gorgeous George". Such showmanship was unheard of at the time; and consequently, arena crowds grew in size as fans turned out to ridicule Wagner (who relished the sudden attention).

Gorgeous George was soon recruited to Los Angeles by promoter Johnny Doyle. Known as the "Human Orchid", his persona was created in part by growing his hair long, dyeing it platinum blonde, and putting gold-plated bobby pins in it (which he called "Georgie Pins" and distributed to the audience). Furthermore, he transformed his ring entrance into a bonafide spectacle that would often take up more time than his actual matches. He strolled nobly to the ring to the sounds of "Pomp and Circumstance", followed by his valet and a purple spotlight. Wearing an elegant robe sporting an array of sequins, Gorgeous George was always escorted down a personal red carpet by his ring valet "Jeffries", who would carry a silver mirror while spreading rose petals at his feet. While Wagner removed his robe, Jeffries would spray the ring with disinfectant, ostensibly Chanel No. 5 perfume, which Wagner referred to as "Chanel #10" ("Why be half-safe?" he was famous for saying) before he would start wrestling. Moreover, George required that his valets spray the referee's hands before the official was allowed to check him for any illegal objects, which thus prompted his now-famous outcry "Get your filthy hands off me!" Once the match finally began, he would cheat in every way he could. Gorgeous George was the industry's first true cowardly villain, and he would cheat at every opportunity, which infuriated the crowd. His credo was "Win if you can, lose if you must, but always cheat!" This flamboyant image and his showman's ability to work a crowd were so successful in the early days of television that he became the most famous wrestler of his time, drawing furious heel heat wherever he appeared.

It was with the advent of television, however, that Wagner's in-ring character became the biggest drawing card the industry had ever known. With the networks looking for cheap, effective programming to fill its time slots, pro wrestling's glorified action became a genuine hit with the viewing public, as it was the first program of any kind to draw a real profit. Consequently, it was Gorgeous George who brought the sport into the nation's living rooms, as his histrionics and melodramatic behavior made him a larger-than-life figure in American pop culture. His first television appearance took place on November 11, 1947 (an event that was named among the top 100 televised acts of the 20th century by Entertainment Weekly) and he immediately became a national celebrity at the same level of Lucille Ball and Bob Hope (who personally donated hundreds of chic robes for George's collection) while changing the course of the industry. No longer was pro-wrestling simply about the in-ring action, but Wagner had created a new sense of theatrics and character performance that had not previously existed. Moreover, in a very real sense, it was Gorgeous George who single-handedly established television as a viable entertainment medium that could potentially reach millions of homes across the country. It is said that George was probably responsible for selling as many television receivers as Milton Berle.

In addition to his grandiose theatrics, Gorgeous George was an accomplished wrestler. While many may have considered him a mere gimmick wrestler, he was actually a very competent freestyle wrestler, having started learning the sport in amateur wrestling as a teenager, and he could handle himself quite well if it came to a legitimate contest. The great Lou Thesz, who would take the AWA title away from Wagner, and who was one of the best "legit" wrestlers ever in professional wrestling, displayed some disdain for the gimmick wrestlers. Nevertheless, he admitted that Wagner "could wrestle pretty well", but added that, "he [Wagner] could never draw a fan until he became Gorgeous George."

On March 26, 1947, Wagner defeated Enrique Torres to capture the Los Angeles Heavyweight Championship. Then on February 22, 1949, he was booked as the feature attraction at New York City's Madison Square Garden in what would be pro wrestling's first return to the building in 12 years. By the 1950s, Gorgeous George's star power was so large that he was able to command 50% of the gate for his performances, which allowed him to earn over $100,000 a year, thus making him one of the highest-paid athletes in the world. Moreover, on May 26, 1950, Gorgeous George defeated Don Eagle to claim the AWA World Heavyweight Championship (Boston version), which he held for several months. During this reign he was beaten by the National Wrestling Alliance World Champion Lou Thesz in a highly publicized bout in Chicago. However, perhaps Gorgeous George's most famous match was against his longtime rival Whipper Billy Watson on March 12, 1959, in which a beaten George had his treasured golden locks shaved bald before 20,000 fans at Toronto's Maple Leaf Gardens and millions more who watched the match on CBC Television.

In one of his final matches, Gorgeous George later faced off against (and lost to) an up-and-coming Bruno Sammartino, though he would lose his precious hair again when he was defeated by the Destroyer in a hair vs. mask match at the Olympic Auditorium on November 7, 1962. This was his final match, as he was nearly 50 years old and suffering from the effects of alcoholism. Gorgeous George appeared in one motion picture, Alias the Champ, made in 1949, which also featured wrestler Tor Johnson.

Retirement and death

As his wrestling career wound down, Wagner invested  in a  turkey ranch built in Beaumont, California, and he used his showman skills to promote his prized poultry at his wrestling matches and sport shows. He raised turkeys and owned a cocktail lounge in Van Nuys, California, which he named "Gorgeous George's Ringside Restaurant".

Wagner was diagnosed with liver cirrhosis in 1962 and his doctors instructed him to retire from wrestling. This, combined with financial troubles that stemmed from a recent divorce, worsened his health. He suffered a heart attack on December 24, 1963, and died two days later, at age 48. A plaque at his gravesite reads "Love to our Daddy Gorgeous George".

Legacy

Muhammad Ali and James Brown acknowledged that their own approach to flamboyant self-promotion was influenced by George. This was referenced in the 2021 movie One Night in Miami.... A 19-year-old Ali met a 46-year-old George at a Las Vegas radio station. During George's radio interview, the wrestler's promo caught the attention of the future heavyweight champion. If George lost to Classy Freddie Blassie, George exclaimed, "I'll crawl across the ring and cut my hair off! But that's not gonna happen because I'm the greatest wrestler in the world!" Ali, who later echoed that very promo when taunting opponent Sonny Liston, recalled, "I saw 15,000 people comin' to see this man get beat. And his talking did it. I said, 'This is a gooood idea!'" In the locker room afterward, the seasoned wrestler gave the future legend some invaluable advice: "A lot of people will pay to see someone shut your mouth. So keep on bragging, keep on sassing and always be outrageous."

In 2002, he was inducted into the inaugural class of the Pro Wrestling Hall of Fame (PWHF.org) by a committee of his peers. On March 27, he was inducted into the WWE Hall of Fame class of 2010. His 97-year-old former wife, Betty Wagner accepted the honor on his behalf, answering questions and telling the story of how he became Gorgeous George.

In September 2008, the first full-length biography of Gorgeous George was published by HarperEntertainment Press. The title of the 304 page book is Gorgeous George: The Outrageous Bad Boy Wrestler who Created American Pop Culture by John Capouya. In the 2005 book I Feel Good: A Memoir in a Life of Soul, James Brown said he used many of Gorgeous George's antics to "create the James Brown you see on stage".

Bob Dylan said meeting George changed his life. In Dylan's book The Chronicles: Volume One, Dylan recounts a story of meeting Gorgeous George in person. He wrote, "He winked and seemed to mouth the phrase, 'You're making it come alive.' I never forgot it. It was all the recognition and encouragement I would need for years."

The 1951 Warner Brothers Merrie Melodies cartoon Bunny Hugged featured the one-shot character "Ravishing Ronald", modeled after Gorgeous George. The Bowery Boys also lampooned Gorgeous George (with Huntz Hall as a much-heralded wrestler) in the 1952 feature No Holds Barred. Musical performers such as Liberace, Little Richard, Elton John, Prince and Morris Day show signs of the George meme.

His theme tune "Pomp and Circumstance" was later also used as a theme tune by Randy Savage in the WWF 1985–1994 (a classical arrangement) and WCW 1994–1997 (a rock  guitar arrangement).

Others in professional wrestling who have used the name "Gorgeous George" include Stephanie Bellars, Gorgeous George III and George Gillette, manager of Kendo Nagasaki.

The 1978 motion picture The One and Only starring Henry Winkler was loosely based on his career.

In the 2000 movie Snatch, Adam Fogerty plays a bare fist fighter named Gorgeous George.

Personal life
Wagner was married twice, first to Betty Hanson (1913–2011), whom he married in 1939 in Eugene, Oregon inside a wrestling ring. They adopted two children. In 1951, after divorcing Betty, he married Cherie Dupré (1927–2000). By this marriage, he had one biological son, Gary George. Cheri filed for divorce from George in April 1962.

Wagner's grandnephew Robert Kellum, best known as "The Maestro" in World Championship Wrestling, also wrestled as "Gorgeous George III" in the United States Wrestling Association.

Championships and accomplishments

American Wrestling Association (Boston)
AWA World Heavyweight Championship (1 time)
 Gulf Coast Championship Wrestling
 NWA Gulf Coast Heavyweight Championship (1 time)
 Mid-South Sports
 NWA Southern Heavyweight Championship (Georgia version) (1 time)
 Professional Wrestling Hall of Fame
 Charter member inducted in 2002
Stampede Wrestling
Stampede Wrestling Hall of Fame (Class of 1995)
 World Wrestling Entertainment
 WWE Hall of Fame (Class of 2010)
 Wrestling Observer Newsletter
 Wrestling Observer Newsletter Hall of Fame (Class of 1996)
 Other titles
Pacific Coast Light Heavyweight Championship (2 times)
 Pacific Northwest Middleweight Championship (1 time)
World Heavyweight Championship (Los Angeles version) (1 time)

Luchas de Apuestas record

See also

 List of premature professional wrestling deaths

Notes

References

External links
 
 House of Deception many photos of Gorgeous George
 Wrestling Museum Hall of Fame
 Nebraska State Education
 Wrestling legends – discusses origin of gimmick
 
 

1915 births
1963 deaths
20th-century American male actors
20th-century American LGBT people
20th-century professional wrestlers
American male professional wrestlers
American people of German descent
Burials at Valhalla Memorial Park Cemetery
LGBT characters in professional wrestling
People from Beaumont, California
People from Boyd County, Nebraska
People from Houston
People from Seward County, Nebraska
Professional wrestlers from Nebraska
Professional Wrestling Hall of Fame and Museum
Professional wrestlers from California
Stampede Wrestling alumni
WWE Hall of Fame inductees